Golok rembau is a type of golok in a shape of the tumbok lada, but in a larger version originating from Sumatra, Indonesia. It is also commonly found in Malaysia.

Description 
This golok has an angular hilt and a curved blade. A ricasso or finger coil on the blade after the handle is a common design in most Golok Rembau. The blade has a pointy tip with a slight drop point and is approximately 23 to 40 cm in length. The edge along the blade has a S shape curvature. While most Golok Rembau use a convex edge, some are made with somewhat hollow or flat ground on the edge near the finger coil for small whittling purposes. The scabbard is usually made of wood, however cheap leather sheath can also be found.

Culture 
In Asahan Regency, Indonesia, the Golok Rembau is thought to have the magical power to protect its bearer from attack by tigers. Hence sometimes this golok is also referred to as Golok Rimau or Golok Harimau. Because of this belief, men who owned or had been able to borrow the Golok Rembau, exhibited their weapons with complacency and pride.

See also

Jimpul
Wedung

References 

Blade weapons
Machetes
Weapons of Indonesia
Weapons of Malaysia